Harold Speed (11 February 1872 – 20 March 1957) was an English painter in oil and watercolour of portraits, figures and historical subjects. He also wrote instructional books for artists that remain in print.

Born in London, the son of Edward Speed, an architect, he studied architecture at the Royal College of Art, but soon took up painting, and continued his studies at the Royal Academy Schools between 1891 and 1896, winning a gold medal and a travelling scholarship in 1893. In 1896, he was elected as a member of the Royal Society of Portrait Painters. Speed was a member of the Art Workers' Guild and was elected as its Master in 1916.

He exhibited at the Royal Academy from 1893, and held his first one-man exhibition in 1907 at the Leicester Galleries. His work was part of the painting event in the art competition at the 1928 Summer Olympics. In 1930 he provided paintings for the new chapel of Wesley House, Cambridge.

Speed lived in Watlington, Oxfordshire and London, where he died on 20 March 1957.

Because of their intelligent combination of useful advice and sensitive reflection on the nature and meaning of artistic practice, Harold Speed's instructional manuals on drawing and painting have long been considered valuable resources for artists. There are editions of his manual "The Practice and Science of Drawing" (1913) in the public domain. His other publications include The Science and Practice of Oil Painting (1924) and What is the Good of Art? (1936).

References

Sources

External links

 
 
 

1872 births
1957 deaths
19th-century English painters
English male painters
20th-century English painters
English watercolourists
English portrait painters
People from Watlington, Oxfordshire
Olympic competitors in art competitions
Masters of the Art Worker's Guild
20th-century English male artists
19th-century English male artists